I Cover Chinatown is a 1936 American crime film directed by Norman Foster and starring Foster, Elaine Shepard and Theodore von Eltz. A San Francisco Chinatown tour guide gets mixed up with a murder. It was Foster's debut as a director and one of his final appearances as an actor.

Cast
 Norman Foster as Eddie Barton  
 Elaine Shepard as Gloria Watkins  
 Vince Barnett as Puss McGaffey - the Bus Driver  
 Theodore von Eltz as Clark Duryea  
 Arthur Lake as Insurance Salesman  
 Polly Ann Young as Myra Duryea  
 Eddie Gribbon as Truck Driver  
 Edward Emerson as Victor Duryea  
 George Hackathorne as Head Waiter  
 Bruce Mitchell as Police Detective  
 Robert Love as Policeman  
 Charita Alden as Rae - Hawaiian Dancer

References

Bibliography
 Pitts, Michael R. Poverty Row Studios, 1929–1940: An Illustrated History of 55 Independent Film Companies, with a Filmography for Each. McFarland & Company, 2005.

External links
 

1936 films
1936 crime films
1930s English-language films
American crime films
Films directed by Norman Foster
Films set in San Francisco
Commodore Pictures films
American black-and-white films
1930s American films